Albert Mobilio is an American poet and critic. He teaches at Eugene Lang College, the liberal arts college of The New School university. His work appears in Bomb, Salon, Postmodern Culture, Harper's.
He is co-editor of Bookforum.

Awards
 1999 The National Book Critics Circle, Nona Balakian Award for Excellence in Reviewing
 2000 Whiting Award

Works

Books

Letters from Mayhem, illustrated by Roger Andersson (New York: Cabinet Books, 2004).

Anthologies

References

External links
Profile at The Whiting Foundation

Eugene Lang College The New School for Liberal Arts faculty
Year of birth missing (living people)
Living people
American male poets